State Route 107 is a short route from Baldwin to Bridgton. The entire route is in Cumberland County.

Route description 
State Route 107 (SR 107) begins where SR 11 branches away from SR 113 in Baldwin. Concurrent with SR 11, SR 107 follows Sebago Road north between Woods Millpond and Sand Pond to an intersection with Sebago Road, where the concurrency with SR 11 ends and SR 11's designation follows Sebago Road northeast. SR 107 then follows Bridgton Road to Long Hill Road, where it nears Sebago. SR 107 turns northeast away from the nearby Sebago Lake, passing Peabody Pond and Hancock Pond. The route then turns north again, terminating at Meadow Road, which carries the designation SR 117, in Bridgton.

Junction list

References

Bridgton, Maine
107
Transportation in Cumberland County, Maine